The eleventh season of the American competitive reality television series MasterChef (also known as MasterChef: Legends) premiered on Fox on June 2, 2021, and concluded on September 15, 2021. Gordon Ramsay, Aarón Sánchez, and Joe Bastianich all returned as judges. The season was won by physical therapist Kelsey Murphy, with bartender Autumn Moretti and food blogger Suu Khin finishing as co-runners-up.

Production
In July 2020, it was reported that the first half of an eleventh season had been filmed, with production shutting down in March due to the COVID-19 pandemic. Production on the season resumed on October 26, 2020. On April 7, 2021, it was announced that the season would premiere on June 2, 2021 and would feature culinary legend guests.

Top 15
Source for all first names, ages, hometowns, and occupations.

Elimination table

 (WINNER) This cook won the competition.
 (RUNNER-UP) This cook finished as a runner-up in the finals.
 (WIN) The cook won the individual challenge (Mystery Box Challenge/ Skills Test or Elimination Test).
 (WIN) The cook was on the winning team in the Team Challenge and directly advanced to the next round.
 (HIGH) The cook was one of the top entries in the individual challenge but didn't win.
 (IN) The cook wasn't selected as a top or bottom entry in an individual challenge.
 (IN) The cook wasn't selected as a top or bottom entry in a team challenge.
 (IMM) The cook didn't have to compete in that round of the competition and was safe from elimination.
 (LOW) The cook was one of the bottom entries in an individual challenge, and they advanced.
 (LOW) The cook was one of the bottom entries in the Team Challenge and they advanced.
 (WDR) The cook withdrew from the competition.
 (ELIM) The cook was eliminated from MasterChef.

Episodes

References 

MasterChef (American TV series)
2021 American television seasons
Television productions suspended due to the COVID-19 pandemic